Ludwinów may refer to the following places in Poland:
Ludwinów, part of the Dębniki district of Kraków
Ludwinów, Greater Poland Voivodeship (west-central Poland)
Ludwinów, Biała Podlaska County in Lublin Voivodeship (east Poland)
Ludwinów, Łęczna County in Lublin Voivodeship (east Poland)
Ludwinów, Puławy County in Lublin Voivodeship (east Poland)
Ludwinów, Gmina Dorohusk in Lublin Voivodeship (east Poland)
Ludwinów, Gmina Borzechów in Lublin Voivodeship (east Poland)
Ludwinów, Gmina Niemce in Lublin Voivodeship (east Poland)
Ludwinów, Opoczno County in Łódź Voivodeship (central Poland)
Ludwinów, Wieruszów County in Łódź Voivodeship (central Poland)
Ludwinów, Mińsk County in Masovian Voivodeship (east-central Poland)
Ludwinów, Radom County in Masovian Voivodeship (east-central Poland)
Ludwinów, Węgrów County in Masovian Voivodeship (east-central Poland)
Ludwinów, Wołomin County in Masovian Voivodeship (east-central Poland)
Ludwinów, Częstochowa County in Silesian Voivodeship (south Poland)
Ludwinów, Myszków County in Silesian Voivodeship (south Poland)
Ludwinów, Busko County in Świętokrzyskie Voivodeship (south-central Poland)
Ludwinów, Włoszczowa County in Świętokrzyskie Voivodeship (south-central Poland)
Ludwinów, Gmina Jędrzejów in Świętokrzyskie Voivodeship (south-central Poland)
Ludwinów, Gmina Małogoszcz in Świętokrzyskie Voivodeship (south-central Poland)
Ludwinów, Gmina Wodzisław in Świętokrzyskie Voivodeship (south-central Poland)